Spain participated at the 2010 Winter Olympics in Vancouver, British Columbia, Canada. The Spanish NOC nominated 18 athletes on 28 January 2010.

Alpine skiing

Men

Women

Biathlon

Women

Cross-country skiing

Men
Distance

Women
Distance

Figure skating

Spain has qualified 1 entrant in men's singles and 1 in ladies singles, for a total of 2 athletes.

Men

Women

Freestyle skiing

Women

Skeleton

Men

Snowboard

Men
Halfpipe

Snowboard cross

Women
Halfpipe

See also
Spain at the 2010 Winter Paralympics

References

Oly
Nations at the 2010 Winter Olympics
2010